Neurophysin I is a carrier protein with a size of 10 KDa and contains 90 to 97 amino acids. It is a cleavage product (formed by splitting of a compound molecule into a simpler one) of preprooxyphysin. It is a neurohypophysial hormone that is transported in vesicles with oxytocin, the other cleavage product, along axons, from magnocellular neurons of the hypothalamus to the posterior lobe of the pituitary. Although it is stored in neurosecretory granules with oxytocin and released with oxytocin, its biological action is unclear.

Function 
Neurophysin I is the carrier protein for oxytocin. It is produced in the cell bodies of the paraventricular and supraoptic nuclei and transported to its site of release in the axon terminals of the posterior pituitary. Neurophysin I neurons are more prevalent in the paraventricular nuclei while Neurophysin II neurons are more prevalent in the supraoptic nuclei. Vasopressin, a hormone similar in structure to oxytocin, is analogously bound and transported by Neurophysin II. Both hormones are nine residues long, and share seven of these residues. Oxytocin possesses Ile-3 and Leu-8 whereas vasopressin possesses Phe-3 and Arg-8. Both Ile and Phe are hydrophobic amino acids and undergo analogous binding to neurophysins.

Structure 
The amino acid sequence of Neurophysin I is:

NH2 - Ala - Ala - Pro - Asp - Leu - Asp - Val - Arg - Lys - Cys - Leu - Pro - Cys - Gly - Pro - Gly - Gly - Lys - Gly - Arg - Cys - Phe - Gly - Pro - Asn - Ile - Cys - Cys - Ala - Glu - Glu - Leu - Gly - Cys - Phe - Val - Gly - Thr - Ala - Glu - Ala - Leu - Arg - Cys - Gln - Glu - Glu - Asn - Tyr - Leu - Pro - Ser - Pro - Cys - Gln - Ser - Gly - Gln - Lys - Ala - Cys - Gly - Ser - Gly - Gly - Arg - Cys - Ala - Val - Leu - Gly - Leu - Cys - Cys - Ser - Pro - Asp - Gly - Cys - His - Ala - Asp - Pro - Ala - Cys - Asp - Ala - Glu - Ala - Thr - Phe - Ser - Gln – Arg - OH

(Disulfide bridge: 10-54; 13-27; 21-44; 28-34; 61-73; 67-85; 74-79)

See also 
 Neurophysins
 Neurophysin II

References 

Integral membrane proteins